James Alexander Murray  (9 November 1864 in Moncton, New Brunswick – 16 February 1960) was a Conservative politician and the 16th premier of New Brunswick. Murray was first elected to the legislature in 1908 and served as Minister of Agriculture before becoming Premier in 1917 only to have his government defeated in the general election weeks later.

External links
Government of New Brunswick biography

1864 births
1960 deaths
Leaders of the Progressive Conservative Party of New Brunswick
People from Moncton
Premiers of New Brunswick